is a water horse in Welsh folklore, a counterpart of the Scottish kelpie.

For example, in North Wales he is represented as being rather formidable with fiery eyes and a dark foreboding presence, whereas in South Wales he is seen more positively as, at worst a cheeky pest to travellers and, at best, as Trevelyan puts it, "luminous, fascinating and sometimes a winged steed".

The  is said to inhabit mountain pools and waterfalls. Even though it appears solid, it can evaporate into the mist.

Another form of the legend reports that the  entices the unwary traveller to ride him. Flying into the air, the  evaporates, dropping the unfortunate rider to his death.

Notes 
Citations

Bibliography

Welsh legendary creatures
Horses in mythology
Shapeshifting
Water spirits